Spede may refer to:

 Spede Pasanen, a Finnish film director and producer, comedian, humorist and TV personality
 SPEDE, an instrument carried on board the Smart-1 satellite